The Tahitian Ligue 1 is the top division of the Fédération Tahitienne de Football in French Polynesia. The league is currently named Ligue 1 Vini for sponsorship reasons.

Competition format
Competition is divided into a regular season and play-offs. The regular season is a league format. At the end of the regular season the top 6 teams – and in past seasons the winners of the Moorea island league – enter a play-off league to determine the overall champions and qualifiers for the OFC Champions League. Meanwhile, the lower teams enter a separate play-off league along with teams from Ligue 2 to determine promotion and relegation for the following season. The league has a point scoring system whereby teams are awarded 4 points for a win, 2 points for a draw and 1 point for a defeat. The only way a team cannot score a point is by failing to field a team. Although it is not unique, and is inspired from the French ranking system for every division below third tier as well as women's league (all before 2016), it has received publicity when the Tahiti national football team qualified for the Confederations Cup, and according to an interview of Charles Ariitoma, the President of the FTF, this was introduced because "we don't want anyone to be sad".

Teams
These are the teams for the 2022–23 Tahiti Ligue 1 season:

Central Sport
Dragon
Excelsior
Jeunes Tahitiens
Olympique de Mahina
Pirae
Pueu
Taiarapu
Tamarii Punaruu
Tefana
Temanava
Vénus

List of champions
Champions so far are:

1948: AS Fei Pi (Papeete)
1949: AS Fei Pi (Papeete)
1950: AS Fei Pi (Papeete)
1951: AS Fei Pi (Papeete)
1952: AS Excelsior (Papeete)
1953: AS Vénus (Mahina)
1954: AS Jeunes Tahitiens (Papeete)
1955: AS Central Sport (Papeete)
1956: AS Excelsior (Papeete)
1957: AS Excelsior (Papeete)
1958: AS Central Sport (Papeete)
1959: AS Excelsior (Papeete)
1960: AS Excelsior (Papeete)
1961: AS Jeunes Tahitiens (Papeete)
1962: AS Central Sport (Papeete)
1963: AS Central Sport (Papeete)
1964: AS Central Sport (Papeete)
1965: AS Central Sport (Papeete)
1966: AS Central Sport (Papeete)
1967: AS Central Sport (Papeete)
1968: AS Fei Pi (Papeete)
1969: AS Tamarii Punaruu (Papeete)
1970: AS Fei Pi (Papeete)
1971: AS Fei Pi (Papeete)
1972: AS Central Sport (Papeete)
1973: AS Central Sport (Papeete)
1974: AS Central Sport (Papeete)
1975: AS Central Sport (Papeete)
1976: AS Central Sport (Papeete)
1977: AS Central Sport (Papeete)
1978: AS Central Sport (Papeete)
1979: AS Central Sport (Papeete)
1980: AS Arue (Arue)
1981: AS Central Sport (Papeete)
1982: AS Central Sport (Papeete)
1983: AS Central Sport (Papeete)
1984: AS PTT (Papeete)
1985: AS Central Sport (Papeete)
1986: AS Excelsior (Papeete)
1987: AS Jeunes Tahitiens (Papeete)
1988: AS Excelsior (Papeete)
1989: AS Pirae (Pirae)
1990: AS Vénus (Mahina)
1991: AS Pirae (Pirae)
1992: AS Vénus (Mahina)
1993: AS Pirae (Pirae)
1994: AS Pirae (Pirae)
1995: AS Vénus (Mahina)
1996: AS Manu-Ura (Papeete)
1997: AS Vénus (Mahina)
1998: AS Vénus (Mahina)
1999: AS Vénus (Mahina)
2000: AS Vénus (Mahina)
2001: AS Pirae (Pirae)
2002: AS Vénus (Mahina)
2003: AS Pirae (Pirae)
2004: AS Manu-Ura (Papeete)
2005: AS Tefana (Faa'a)
2005–06: AS Pirae (Pirae)
2006–07: AS Manu-Ura (Papeete)
2007–08: AS Manu-Ura (Papeete)
2008–09: AS Manu-Ura (Papeete)
2009–10: AS Tefana (Faa'a)
2010–11: AS Tefana (Faa'a)
2011–12: AS Dragon (Papeete)
2012–13: AS Dragon (Papeete)
2013–14: AS Pirae (Pirae)
2014–15: AS Tefana (Faa'a)
2015–16: AS Tefana (Faa'a)
2016–17: AS Dragon (Papeete)
2017–18: AS Central Sport
2018–19: AS Vénus (Mahina)
2019–20: AS Pirae (Pirae)
2020-21: AS Pirae (Pirae)
2021-22: AS Pirae (Pirae)

Performances

Performances by club

Performances by city

Topscorers

Most goals in a single game
12 goals: 
Roonui Tinirauari (Dragon), 17-0 against Jeunes Tahitiens, round 10, season 2022-23.

Most goals in a single season
53 goals: 
Teaonui Tehau, (2017-18).

Multiple hat-tricks

Most Hat-tricks in a single season
 10 Hat-tricks:
 Teaonui Tehau (2017-18)

References

External links 
Fédération Tahitienne de Football

 
Top level football leagues in Oceania
Sports leagues established in 1948
1948 establishments in French Polynesia
Football leagues in Overseas France